Bitola Oblast was one of the oblasts of the Kingdom of Serbs, Croats and Slovenes from 1922 to 1929. Its capital was Bitola, which the oblast was named after.

History 
The Kingdom of Serbs, Croats and Slovenes was formed in 1918 and was initially divided into counties and districts (this division was inherited from previous state administrations). In 1922, the country was divided into 33 new administrative units known as oblasts.  Before 1922, the territory of the Bitola Oblast was primarily part of the Bitola District.

In 1929, the 33 oblasts were administratively replaced with 9 banovinas and one district, and the territory of the Bitola Oblast was incorporated into the new Vardar Banovina.

Geography 
Bitola Oblast included most of what is now the Southwestern, Pelagonia, Vardar, and Southeastern Statistical Regions. It shared borders with the Skjope and Bregalnica Oblasts to the north, Albania to the east, Greece to the south, and Bulgaria to the west.

Demographics 
According to 1921 census, Bitola Oblast was linguistically dominated by speakers of Bulgarian.

Cities and Towns 
The main cities and towns located within the oblast were:

 Bitola
 Kavadarci
 Ohrid
 Struga
 Gevgelija

All mentioned cities and towns are now part of North Macedonia.

See also 

 Bitola
 North Macedonia
 Kingdom of Serbs, Croats and Slovenes

References

Further reading 

 Istorijski atlas, Geokarta, Beograd, 1999.
 Istorijski atlas, Intersistem kartografija, Beograd, 2010.

Bitola
States and territories established in 1922
States and territories disestablished in 1929
History of North Macedonia
Yugoslav Macedonia
20th century in North Macedonia
Oblasts of the Kingdom of Serbs, Croats and Slovenes
History of Bitola